Ľubomír Hurtaj (born 28 November 1975) is a Slovak former professional ice hockey player.

Hurtaj played in the Slovak Extraliga for HC Prešov, HK Spišská Nová Ves, HK Nitra, HK Dukla Trenčín, HC Slovan Bratislava, MHC Martin, HKm Zvolen and HC Nové Zámky. He also played in the Czech Extraliga for HC Plzeň, HC Karlovy Vary and HC Vítkovice, the SM-liiga for HIFK, the Nationalliga A for Lausanne HC and the Deutsche Eishockey Liga for EHC Wolfsburg.

References

External links

1975 births
Living people
HC '05 Banská Bystrica players
HC Slovan Bratislava players
HSC Csíkszereda players
Dunaújvárosi Acélbikák players
Guildford Flames players
HIFK (ice hockey) players
HC Karlovy Vary players
Lausanne HC players
MHC Martin players
HK Nitra players
HC Nové Zámky players
HC Plzeň players
HC Prešov players
Slovak ice hockey centres
HK Spišská Nová Ves players
Sportspeople from Topoľčany
HK Dukla Trenčín players
HC Vítkovice players
Grizzlys Wolfsburg players
HKM Zvolen players
Slovak expatriate ice hockey players in Finland
Slovak expatriate sportspeople in Romania
Expatriate ice hockey players in Romania
Slovak expatriate ice hockey players in the Czech Republic
Slovak expatriate ice hockey players in Germany
Slovak expatriate ice hockey players in Switzerland
Slovak expatriate sportspeople in Hungary
Expatriate ice hockey players in Hungary
Slovak expatriate sportspeople in England
Expatriate ice hockey players in England